Kanai Lal Sarker (1925 – 1980) was a Bangladeshi politician from Kurigram belonging to Bangladesh Awami League. He was a member of the Jatiya Sangsad.

Biography
Sarker was born on 1925. He was elected as a member of the East Pakistan Provincial Assembly in 1970. After the Liberation of Bangladesh he was elected as a member of the Jatiya Sangsad from Rangpur-15 in 1973.

Sarker died on 1980.

References

1925 births
1980 deaths
1st Jatiya Sangsad members
People from Kurigram District
Awami League politicians